Snyder may refer to:

Places in the United States 
 Snyder, Colorado
 Snyder, Missouri
 Snyder, Nebraska
 Snyder, New York
 Snyder, Oklahoma
 Snyder, Texas
 Snyder County, Pennsylvania
Snyder Township, Blair County, Pennsylvania
Snyder Township, Jefferson County, Pennsylvania

People 
Snyder (surname)

Fictional characters
Alan Snyder, the leader of the Los Angeles bloc in Colony
Carly Snyder, character in As the World Turns
Holden Snyder, character in As the World Turns
Jack Snyder (As the World Turns), character in As the World Turns
Luke Snyder, character in As the World Turns
Meg Snyder, character in As the World Turns
Principal Snyder, character in Buffy the Vampire Slayer

See also 
 Snyder High School (disambiguation)
 Schneider (disambiguation)
 Schnyder
 Snider (disambiguation)
 Snyders (disambiguation)